Estrogen-related receptor gamma (ERR-gamma), also known as NR3B3 (nuclear receptor subfamily 3, group B, member 3), is a nuclear receptor that in humans is encoded by the ESRRG (EStrogen Related Receptor Gamma) gene. It behaves as a constitutive activator of transcription.

This protein is a member of nuclear hormone receptor  family of steroid hormone receptors. No physiological activating ligand is known for this orphan receptor, but 4-hydroxytamoxifen and diethylstilbestrol act as inverse agonists and deactivate ESRRG. It also seems to be the target of bisphenol A (see below).

Bisphenol A binding 

There is evidence that bisphenol A functions as a xenoestrogen by binding strongly to ERR-γ. BPA as well as its nitrated and chlorinated metabolites seems to binds strongly to ERR-γ (dissociation constant = 5.5 nM), but not to the estrogen receptor (ER)., BPA binding to ERR-γ preserves its basal constitutive activity. It can also protect it from deactivation from the selective estrogen receptor modulator 4-hydroxytamoxifen.

Different expression of ERR-γ in different parts of the body may account for variations in bisphenol A effects. For instance, ERR-γ has been found in high concentration in the placenta, explaining reports of high bisphenol A accumulation there.

References

External links

Further reading 

 
 
 
 
 
 
 
 
 
 
 
 
 
 
 

Intracellular receptors
Transcription factors
Human female endocrine system